The 1996–97 Algerian Championnat National was the 35th season of the Algerian Championnat National since its establishment in 1962. A total of 16 teams contested the league, with USM Alger as the defending champions, The Championnat started on october 10, 1996. and ended on June 26, 1997.

Team summaries

Promotion and relegation 
Teams promoted from Algerian Division 2 1996-1997 
 ES Mostaganem
 ES Sétif
 USM Blida

Teams relegated to Algerian Division 2 1997-1998
 USM Aïn Beïda
 NA Hussein Dey
 WA Mostaganem

League table

References

External links
1996–97 Algerian Championnat National

Algerian Championnat National
Championnat National
Algerian Ligue Professionnelle 1 seasons